is a Japanese boy band formed by Johnny & Associates on October 6, 2018. It consists of seven members who primarily come from the Kansai region. The group's official debut announcement was made on July 28, 2021, through their label J Storm. Their debut single, "Ubu Love", was released on November 12, 2021. Naniwa Danshi is the fourth Johnny & Associates group from the Kansai region to make an official debut after Kinki Kids, Kanjani Eight, and Johnny's West. The name "Naniwa" refers to the old name of Osaka (also name of a ward in Osaka). In just 4 months they sold 1.14 million physical copies in Japan.

History 
Naniwa Danshi is produced by Kanjani Eight's Tadayoshi Okura. Prior to Naniwa Danshi, a Kansai Johnny's Jr trio unit called  was formed in August 2012. Naniwa Ouji includes the two current members Daigo Nishihata, Ryusei Onishi, and Ren Nagase, who later became a member of King & Prince.

The group's formation was informed to the members through mass e-mails, as opposed of being called directly to Johnny Kitagawa's place, leading members to think that "it was a prank." Nishihata thought it was a prank due to the group's name "Naniwa Danshi" just means they are "people from Kansai." Now he's grateful for it since people are easier to remember them with the name. Formation of Naniwa Danshi was the first time in 4 years for Kansai Johnny's Jr and was publicly announced through the magazine Potato. 

On January 5, 2021, Naniwa Danshi, along with two other Kansai Johnny's Jr. groups (Ae! group and Lil Kansai), joined the Johnny's Jr. official YouTube channel, indirectly replacing SixTones and Snow Man after their departure from the channel.

The group's official debut was announced through their Naniwa Danshi First Arena Tour 2021 #NaniwaDanshiShikaKatan concert at Yokohama Arena, which was also a surprise for themselves. The debut was announced on Naniwa Day (July 28). This also marks the long-awaited debut for Joichiro Fujiwara, who had been a trainee for 17 years 8 months—the longest in Johnny's history. Alongside their debut CD release, an Instagram account was also made. They also "graduated" from the Johnny's Jr YouTube channel and opened their own YouTube channel.

Members 

  
 
 
 
 
  – sub-leader
  – leader

Discography

Studio albums

Singles

Video albums

Tie-ins

Filmography

Dramas & TV Shows etc

Films

Commercials

Concert tours

Solo concerts 

 
 NANIWA DANSHI LIVE 2020 「Shall we #AOHARU」(2020)
 Kansai Johnny's DREAM PAVILION 〜Shall we #AOHARU?〜 (streamed on Johnny's Net Online)
 
 

Concerts as Kansai Johnny's jr

 Fall in LOVE ~Fall in Love with Kanju in Autumn~ (2018)
 Kansai Johnny's Jr (X'mas Party!! 2018)
 Kansai Johnny's Jr LIVE 2019 Happy 2 year!! ~Chu Year with Kanju this year too!!~
 Kansai Johnny's Jr (SPRING SPECIAL SHOW 2019)
 Johnny's IsLAND Festival (2019)
 Johnny's Jr. 8.8 Festival ~Starting with Tokyo Dome~ (2019)
 Kanju Dream's Kansai Island 2020 in Kyosera Dome Osaka ~Come Play! Satisfaction 100%~ (2020)
 Johnny's DREAM IsLAND 2020→2025 ~From My Beloved City~ (streamed on Johnny's Net Online)

Other media 
A virtual idol collaboration project between Johnny & Associates and Showroom started from 2019 which features two members Joichiro Fujiwara and Kazuya Ohashi. They voiced  and  respectively and streamed every day at 21:30 JST on Showroom. Honeyworks handles the music and character designs. Along with Naniwa Danshi's official debut, both of them "graduated" from the project in 2021.

Notes

References

External links
 Naniwa Danshi Official website - J Storm
 
 
 
  on YouTube

Japanese boy bands
Japanese pop music groups
Japanese idol groups
Johnny & Associates
2018 establishments in Japan
Musical groups established in 2018
J Storm